Antrodemus ("chamber bodied") is a dubious genus of theropod dinosaur from the Kimmeridgian-Tithonian age Upper Jurassic Morrison Formation of Middle Park, Colorado. It contains one species, Antrodemus valens, first described and named as a species of Poekilopleuron by Joseph Leidy in 1870.

The first described fossil specimen was a bone obtained secondhand by Ferdinand Vandeveer Hayden in 1869 (original discoverer unknown). It came from Middle Park, near Granby, Colorado, probably from Morrison Formation rocks. The locals had identified such bones as petrified horse hooves. Hayden sent his specimen to Joseph Leidy, who identified it as half of a tail vertebra, and tentatively assigned it to the European dinosaur genus Poekilopleuron as Poicilopleuron [sic] valens. He later decided it deserved its own genus, Antrodemus.

In 1920, Charles W. Gilmore came to the conclusion that the tail vertebra named Antrodemus by Leidy was indistinguishable from those of Allosaurus, and that Antrodemus should be the preferred name because, as the older name, it had priority. Antrodemus became the accepted name for this familiar genus for over fifty years, until James Madsen published on the Cleveland-Lloyd specimens of Allosaurus and concluded that the Allosaurus name should be used because Antrodemus was based on material with poor, if any, diagnostic features and locality information (for example, the geological formation that the single bone of Antrodemus came from is unknown). Subsequent authors have agreed with this assessment and have considered Antrodemus a nomen dubium.

References

Late Jurassic dinosaurs of North America
Allosaurids
Nomina dubia
Fossil taxa described in 1873
Taxa named by Joseph Leidy
Paleontology in Colorado